Vin Suprynowicz (born c. 1950) is an American libertarian author who formerly edited editorial pages for the Las Vegas, Nevada-based Las Vegas Review-Journal. He has published two volumes of nonfiction essays on the philosophy of law and society, Send In the Waco Killers (1999) and The Ballad of Carl Drega (2002). In 2005, he published his debut novel, The Black Arrow.

Biography
Vin Suprynowicz was born in Connecticut. He attended local schools, graduating from E. O. Smith High School in 1968. He graduated from Wesleyan University (Middletown, Connecticut) in 1972 with a degree in art and a concentration in filmmaking.

He started his journalism career writing on a part-time basis for the Hartford Advocate, before becoming (in succession) a reporter for the Willimantic Chronicle, a news editor of the Norwich Bulletin, and the managing editor of the daily Northern Virginia Sun. He also published the Providence Eagle from 1980 to 1985.

At that time Suprynowicz moved to Arizona where he was editor-in-chief of the West Valley View, a newspaper serving the western Phoenix metropolitan area. In 1992 Suprynowicz was offered a position with the Las Vegas Review-Journal and moved to Nevada.

He became involved with the Libertarian Party. In 2000 he ran in Arizona as the vice-presidential candidate of the Libertarian Party with L. Neil Smith as the presidential candidate.  Art Olivier and Harry Browne were the Libertarian Party candidates in the other 49 states.

Suprynowicz is also a member and supporter of the Free State Project.He is a regular contributor to Shotgun News magazine.

References

External links 
 "About Vin", his official website
 Columns at Las Vegas Review-Journal
 Individuals endorsing the Free State Project (title subject's name not appearing).
 Firearms News, formerly Shotgun News.

1950s births
American columnists
American political writers
American male non-fiction writers
American newspaper reporters and correspondents
Living people
Wesleyan University alumni
Writers from Connecticut
Writers from Nevada
People from the Las Vegas Valley
Place of birth missing (living people)
Libertarian Party (United States) vice presidential nominees
Nevada Libertarians
American male novelists